This list of 2020 United States presidential electors contains members of the Electoral College, known as "electors", who cast ballots to elect the president of the United States and vice president of the United States in the 2020 presidential election. There are 538 electors from the 50 states and the District of Columbia.

The members of the 2020 Electoral College met on December 14, 2020. 306 electors voted for Joe Biden for President and Kamala Harris for Vice President. 232 electors voted for Donald Trump for President and Mike Pence for Vice President. There were no faithless electors. Congress met on January 6 and 7, 2021, to count the votes.

While every state except Nebraska and Maine chooses the electors by statewide vote, many states require that one elector be designated for each congressional district. These electors are chosen by each party before the general elections. A vote for that party then confirms their position. In all states except Nebraska and Maine, each state's electors are winner-take-all. In Maine and Nebraska within each congressional district one elector is allocated by popular vote – the states' remaining two electors (representing the 2 U.S. Senate seats) are winner-take-both. Except where otherwise noted, such designations refer to the elector's residence in that district rather than election by the voters of the district.

Alabama

Electors: 9, pledged to vote for Donald Trump for President and Mike Pence for Vice President:

Jacquelyn Gay (District 1) – Republican Activist (Brewton)
Jeana S. Boggs (District 2) – Court Reporter (Montgomery)
Joseph R. Fuller (District 3) – Attorney (Alexander City)
John H. Killian (District 4) – Baptist Minister (Fayette)
J. Elbert Peters (District 5) – Chair, District Five Republican Party (Huntsville)
Joan Reynolds (District 6) – Chair, Shelby County Republican Party
Rick Pate (District 7) – State Commissioner of Agriculture
Dennis H. Beavers (At-Large) – State Director, Trump 2020 Campaign
John Wahl (At-Large) – Vice Chair, State Party (Limestone County)

Alaska

Electors: 3, pledged to vote for Donald Trump for President and Mike Pence for Vice President

 John Binkley – Riverboat Pilot (Fairbanks)
 Judy Eledge – Retired Educator (Anchorage)
 Randy Ruedrich – Former State Party Chair (2000–2013)

Arizona

Electors: 11, pledged to vote for Joe Biden for President and Kamala Harris for Vice President:
 Constance Jackson – Vice President, NAACP
 Felecia Rotellini – Chair, Arizona Democratic Party
 Fred Yamashita – Executive Director, Arizona AFL-CIO
 James McLaughlin – President, Arizona AFL-CIO
 Jonathan Nez – President of the Navajo Nation
 Luis Alberto Heredia – Democratic National Committee member
 Ned Norris Jr. – Chairman of Tohono O'odham Nation 
 Regina Romero – Mayor of Tucson
 Sandra Kennedy – Corporation Commissioner
 Stephen Roe Lewis – Governor, Gila River Indian Community 
 Steve Gallardo – Member of the Maricopa County Board of Supervisors

Arkansas

Electors: 6, pledged to vote for Donald Trump for President and Mike Pence for Vice President:

 Sharon Brooks – Sebastian County Clerk
 Iverson Jackson – Minister (Little Rock)
 George Ritter – Deputy General Counsel, Republican Party of Arkansas 
 Rod Soubers – Chair, Baxter County Republican Party
 Doyle Webb – Chair, Arkansas Republican Party
 Joseph Wood – Judge (Washington County)

California

Electors: 55, pledged to vote for Joe Biden for President and Kamala Harris for Vice President:

 Agustin Arreola – Community Organizer, 23, Thermal
 Joy Atkinson
 Katherine Bancroft – Native American Activist, Lone Pine
 Kara Bechtle – Tuolumne County Democratic Party, Soulsbyville
 Brandon Benjamin – Campaign Staffer, Liam O'Mara, Corona
 Janine Bera, MD – Wife of Congressman Ami Bera 
 Peter Bolland – Philosophy Professor, San Diego
 Mary Bowker – Organizer and Activist, Napa
 Janice Brown – Labor Lawyer, San Diego
 John Casey
 Jacki Cisneros – Wife of Congressman Gil Cisneros
 Marsha Conant – Stonewall Democrats, Fresno
 Joseph Patrick Cox 
 Freddye Davis – NAACP Activist, Hayward
 Emily Dredd – Staffer, Governor Newsom, Sacramento
 Lee Fink – Attorney, Tustin
 Bryan Fletcher – Former NFL Player, San Diego
 Mark Gonzalez – Chair, Los Angeles County Democratic Party 
 Madeline Handy – UC-Davis Student
 Ronald Herrera – Teamsters, Long Beach
 Rusty Hicks – American labor union activist, Chair of the California Democratic Party, Pasadena
 Jihee Huh – Attorney, Rolling Hills
 LaNiece Jones – Community Organizer, Oakland
 Elizabeth Kann – Physician, Walnut Grove
 David M. Kennedy
 Dona Kerkvliet-Varin – Democratic Activist, Turlock
 Vinzenz Koller – Monterey County Democrats, Carmel
 Franklin Lima – Firefighter, Camarillo 
 Christina Marquez – Teacher, San Bernardino
 Yvette Martinez
 Pete McCloskey – now-Democratic former Republican United States Representative
 Thomas McInerney – Attorney, former Marin County elected official, San Anselmo
 Jillian McNerney – Daughter in Law, Congressman Jerry McNerney 
 Nelida Mendoza – City Council, Santa Ana
 Bettey Monroy – Downey Democratic Party
 Brock Neeley – LGBTQ Activist, Porterville
 Jane Pandell – Attorney, Danville
 Bill Prady – television producer
 Andre Quintero – Mayor, El Monte
 Amy Rao – Philanthropist, Palo Alto
 Kevin Sabellico – Organizer for Kamala Harris, Carlsbad
 Anne Sanger – City Government, Sacramento
 Mattie Scott – Gun violence Activist, San Francisco
 Suzanne Singer – Rabbi, Riverside
 Brian Solecki – Campaign Manager, Rep. Audrey Denney, Chico
 Darrell Steinberg – Mayor, Sacramento
 Erin Sturdivant – College Student, Piedmont
 Tamlyn Tomita – Actress, Glendale 
 Robert Torres – City Council, Pomona
 Karen Waters – Daughter of Rep. Maxine Waters, Inglewood 
 Shirley Weber – State Assembly, San Diego
 Katherine Wilkinson – Professor, San Jose State
 Tayte Williams – College Student, Los Angeles
 Brandon Zavala – Campaign Manager, Christy Smith For Congress

Colorado

Electors: 9, pledged to vote for Joe Biden for President and Kamala Harris for Vice President

 Anita Lynch – Bernie Sanders Activist, 74, Denver 
 Jerad Sutton – Chair, Weld County Democratic Party
 Judith Ingelido – Retired teacher, 73, Colorado Springs
 Victoria Marquesen – Retired education professor, Pueblo
 Polly Baca – former state legislator, four time elector 
 Bryan Hartmann – Democratic Activist, Highlands Ranch 
 Alan Kennedy – Attorney/Law Professor, Denver
 Susan McFaddin, Sustainable Home Builder, Fort Collins
 Roger Fang (replacement for Ann Knollman)

Connecticut

Electors: 7, pledged to Joe Biden for President and Kamala Harris for Vice President

 Dana Barcellos Allen of Avon, a staffer for Rep. Jahana Hayes 
 Susan Barrett, Town Chair of Fairfield
 Dominic Balletto Jr of East Haven, Chair of the CT Democratic Party
 John Kalamarides of Wilton, Chair of Wilton Democrats
 William Smith of Hartford
 Myrna Watanabe of Harwinton, a biology professor
 Anthony Attanasio of Niantic, an engineer

Delaware

Electors: 3, pledged to vote for Joe Biden for President and Kamala Harris for Vice President

 John Daniello – Former State Party Chairman
 Marla Blunt-Carter – Professor Rutgers-Camden, Sister of US Rep. Lisa Blunt Rochester
 Marie Mayor – Former legislative candidate

District of Columbia

Electors: 3, pledged to vote for Joe Biden for President and Kamala Harris for Vice President:

 Jacqueline Echavarria (At-Large) – Safeway cashier
 Meedie Bardonille (At-Large) – Washington DC Board of Nursing
 Barbara Helmick (At-Large) – Program Director, DC Vote

Florida

Electors: 29, pledged to vote for Donald Trump for President and Mike Pence for Vice President:

 Maximo Alvarez – Businessman (Miami)
 Jeff Brandes – State Senator
 John Browning – Transportation Commission; 2016 Elector
 Marili Cancio – Attorney (Miami)
 Nelson Diaz – Chair, Miami-Dade Republican Party
 Peter Feaman – Attorney (Boynton Beach); 2016 Elector
 Randy Fine – State Representative (Brevard County)
 Jason Fischer – State Representative (Jacksonville Area)
 Charlotte Flynt – Chair, Walton County Republican Party
 Joe Gruters – State Senator and Chair, State Party
 Roy Hinman – Physician (Saint Augustine)
 James Holton – Attorney (Saint Petersburg)
 Marva Johnson – Chair, Florida State Board of Education 
 Belinda Keiser – Vice Chancellor, Keiser University
 Kathleen King – Republican National Committee Member
 J.C. Martin – Chair, Polk County Republican Party
 Patrick Neal – Realtor; Former State Senator
 Jeanette Nuñez – Lieutenant Governor 
 Kathleen Passidomo – State Senator (Collier County)
 Daniel Perez – State Representative
 Keith Perry – State Senator
 Moshe Popack – Realtor/Attorney (Miami)
 Ray Wesley Rodrigues – State Senator 
 Diane Scherff – Chair, Saint Johns County (South Ponte Verde)
 Frank Schwerin – Cardiologist (Naples)
 Chris Sprowls – Speaker, Florida House of Representatives
 Linda Stoch – Pam Beach Gardens
 Tim Weisheyer – Realtor (Kissimmee)
 Christian Ziegler – Sarasota County Commissioner; 2016 Elector

Georgia

Electors: 16, pledged to vote for Joe Biden for President and Kamala Harris for Vice President:

 Nikema Williams, Democratic Party of Georgia Chair, State Senator, Congressmember-elect
 Stacey Abrams, former Georgia House Minority Leader, activist
 Bob Trammell, outgoing State Representative
 Steve Henson, State Senator
 Calvin Smyre, State Representative
 Van R. Johnson, Mayor of Savannah
 Wendy Davis – City Council, Rome GA
 Gloria Butler, State Senator
 Deborah Gonzalez, District Attorney-elect of Western Judicial Circuit, former State Representative
 Bobby Fuse – Civil Rights Activist; Chair, 2nd District Democrats
 Sachin Varghese – Attorney, Georgia Democratic Party
 Fenika Miller – Houston County Democratic Party, Chair of 8th Congressional District Democrats
 Pedro Marin, State Representative
 Rachel Paule – Chair, Georgia Young Democrats, Sandy Springs
 Cathy Woolard, former Atlanta City Council member
 Ben Myers – Political Affairs Director, IBEW, Duluth GA

In addition, 3 alternate Democratic electors were selected in case any of the electors could not attend: Alaina Reeves, Bianca Keaton and Jason Esteves.

Hawaii

Electors: 4, pledged to vote for Joe Biden for President and Kamala Harris for Vice President:

 Hermina 'Mina' Morita (At-Large) – Member of the Public Utilities Commission
 John William Bickel (At-Large) – Teacher and Democratic Activist
 Kainoa Kaumeheiwa-Rego (At-Large) – LGBTQ Activist, State Treasurer of Hawaii Democratic Party
 Michael Golojuch (At-Large) – Veteran, Civil Servant

Idaho

Electors: 4, pledged to vote for Donald Trump for President and Mike Pence for Vice President

 Rod Beck – Former State Senator
 Raúl Labrador – Former US Representative
 Janice McGeachin - Lieutenant Governor
 Melinda Smyser – Director, Idaho Office of Drug Policy (Parma)

Illinois

Electors: 20, pledged to vote for Joe Biden for President and Kamala Harris for Vice President:

 Michelle A. Harris (District 1)
 Al Riley (District 2)
 Silvana Tabares (District 3)
 Omar Aquino (District 4)
 Cynthia Santos (District 5) – former board member of the Metropolitan Water Reclamation District of Greater Chicago
 Nancy Shepardson (District 6) – State Central Committee, Barrington
 Vera Davis (District 7) – Wife of US Representative Danny K. Davis
 Michael Cudzik (District 8) – Chair, Schaumburg Area Democratic Party
 Michael Cabonargi (District 9) 
 Lauren Beth Gash (District 10)
 Julia Kennedy Beckman (District 11) – School Board Member, Darien
 Chris Welch (replacing Jerry Costello) (District 12)
 Jayne Mazzotti (District 13) – Language Teacher, Taylorville
 Kristina Zahorik (District 14) – Chair, McHenry County Democratic Party
 Brandon Phelps (District 15)
 Christine Benson (District 16) – Illinois State Board of Education
 Don Johnston (District 17) – County Board, Rock Island County
 Sheila Stocks-Smith (District 18) – Urban Action Network, Springfield
 Lori Lightfoot Mayor of Chicago (At-Large)
 Don Harmon State Senate President (At-Large)

Indiana

Electors: 11, pledged to vote for Donald Trump for President and Mike Pence for Vice President

 Don E. Bates Jr. – Accountant (Saint John)
 George Brown – LaGrange County Judge
 Beth Boyce – Chair, Johnson County Republican Party
 James R. Buck - State Senator 
 Dana Dumezich – Lake County Elections Board
 Jeffery M. Heinzmann – Attorney (Fishers)
 Brian L. Mowery – Indianapolis City Council
 Courtney Papa – Vice President, Elhart County Republican Party
 Edwin J. Simcox – Former Indiana Secretary of State
 William Springer – Chair, Sullivan County Republican Party
 Matthew D. Whetstone – State Representative (Brownsburg)

Iowa

Electors: 6, pledged to vote for Donald Trump for President and Mike Pence for Vice President:

 David Chung (District 1) – Technical Trainer (Cedar Rapids) 
 Thad Nearmyer (District 2) – Jasper County Republican Party (Monroe)
 Ronald Forsell (District 3) – Assistant County Attorney (Waukee)
 Kolby Dewitt (District 4) – Staffer, US Senate (Sioux City)
 Charlie Johnson (At-large) – Pottawattamie County Chair (Council Bluffs)
 Kurt Brown (At-large) – Former Recorder, O'Brien County (Primghar); Elector in 2012, 2016

Kansas

Electors: 6, pledged to vote for Donald Trump for President and Mike Pence for Vice President 

 Treatha Brown Foster – former President, Kansas Black Republican Council (Wichita)
 Shannon Golden – Executive Director, Kansas State Party
 Mark Kahrs – Republican National Committee (also 2016 elector)
 Mike Kuckelman  – Chair, Kansas State Party
 Helen Van Etten – Republican National Committee (also 2016 elector)
 Emily Wellman – Secretary, Kansas State Party

Kentucky

Electors: 8, pledged to vote for Donald Trump for President and Mike Pence for Vice President:

 Richard J. Grana (District 1) – State Party Executive Committee
 Laura LaRue (District 2) – Chair, Second District Republicans
 Jack L. Richardson IV (District 3) – Attorney (Louisville)
 Earl Bush (District 4) – Judge (Bracken County)
 Bob M. Hutchison (District 5) – Chair, Fifth District Republicans
 Ken Kearns II (District 6) – Former legislative candidate
 Carol Rogers (At-large) – Chair, Sixth District Republicans
 Ellen Williams (At-large) – Former Chair, State Party

Louisiana

Electors: 8, pledged to vote for Donald Trump for President and Mike Pence for Vice President:

Eric F. Skrmetta (District 1) – Public Service Commission
Robert C. Monti (District 2) – Saint Charles Parish Chair (Luling)
Ross Little, Jr. (District 3) – Republican National Committee
Rodney Michael Collier (District 4) – Investment Broker (Benton)
Kay Kellogg Katz (District 5) – Former State Representative
Beth A. Billings (District 6) – St Charles Parish Chair (Destrehan)
Louis "Woody" Jenkins (At-Large) – Journalist; State Representative (1976–2000)
Vinson J. Serio (At-Large) – Accountant (Metairie)

Maine

Electors: 4, 3 pledged to vote for Joe Biden for President and Kamala Harris for Vice President:
Jay Philbrick (District 1) – College Student, Brown University, 18; North Yarmouth 
 State Senator Shenna Bellows (At-Large) 
David Bright (At-Large) – Farmer, Dixmont; 2016 Elector

1 pledged to vote for Donald Trump for President and Mike Pence for Vice President:
 Peter LaVerdiere (District 2) – Former Board Chair (Oxford ME), 79

Maryland

Electors: 10, pledged to vote for Joe Biden for President and Kamala Harris for Vice President:

 Sheree Sample-Hughes (District 1) – Speaker Pro Tem, Maryland Assembly
 Sachin Hebbar (District 2) – Candidate, State Representative 
 Catalina Rodriguez-Lima (District 3) – Immigrant Affair staffer, Baltimore Mayors Office
 Gloria Lawlah (District 4) – State Secretary of Aging 
 Kent Robertson (District 5) – State Party Central Committee, Prince Georges County
 Patrick Hunt (District 6) – Chair, Garrett County Democratic Party
 Thelma T. Daley (District 7) – Professional Educator, Baltimore 
 Corynne Courpas (District 8) – Chair, Carroll County Democratic Party
 Kathleen Matthews (At-Large) 
 Peter E. Perini, Sr. (At-Large) – City Council, Hagerstown

Massachusetts

Electors: 11, pledged to vote for Joe Biden for President and Kamala Harris for Vice President:

Kate Donaghue (At-Large) – MA Democratic Central Committee
Nicolle LaChapelle (At-Large) – Mayor, Easthampton
Joseph F Kelly (At Large) – Electrician, IBEW, Hingham
Tom Larkin (At-Large) – Retired Psychologist, University of MA, 84
Robert Markell (At-Large) – Former Mayor, Springfield
Linda Monteiro (At-Large) – Staffer, State Senator Miranda
Jay Rivera (At-Large) – Democratic Activist, Lawrence
Norma Shulman (At-Large) – Elizabeth Warren Activist, Framingham
 Lesley Phillips (replacement for Ron Valerio) (At-Large) 
Teresa Walsh (At-Large) – State Committeewoman, Middlesex
Wayne Yeh (At-Large) – LGBTQ Activist, Jamaica Plain

Michigan

Electors: 16, pledged to vote for Joe Biden for President and Kamala Harris for Vice President:
Chris Cracchiolo (District 1) – Grand Traverse Democratic Party, Williamsburg
Timothy Smith (District 2) – Michigan Education Association, Grand Haven
Blake Mazurek (District 3) – History Teacher, Grand Rapids 
Bonnie Lauria (District 4) – Retired Autoworker, 79, West Branch
Bobbie Walton (District 5) – Democratic Activist, 83, Davison
Mark Miller (District 6) – City Clerk, Kalamazoo
Connor Wood (District 7) – Jackson County Democratic Party
Robin Smith (District 8) – Librarian, Lansing
Walt Herzig (District 9) – Staffer for Rep. Andy Levin, Ferndale (Mr. Herzig was unable to attend meeting of electors on December 14, 2020. Sharon Baseman, also of District 9, was nominated to replace him and the electors unanimously agreed to seat Sharon Baseman as an elector.)
Carolyn Holley (District 10) – Retired Activist, 81, Port Huron
Susan Nichols (District 11) – Legal Assistant, Northville
Steven Rzeppa (District 12) – Communications Director, AFSCME
Helen Moore (District 13) – Education Activist, 84, Detroit
Michael Kerwin (District 14) – UAW Retiree, 96
Marseille Allen (At-Large) – Michigan Department of Corrections, Flint
Chuck Browning (At-Large) – UAW Director, Rockwood

Minnesota

Electors: 10, pledged to vote for Joe Biden for President and Kamala Harris for Vice President:

 Melvin Aanerud – Author, Ham Lake MN
 Muhammad Abdurrahman – Technology Professor, Minneapolis [2016 Elector]
 Joel Heller – Executive Committee, Minnesota DFL
 Nausheena Hussain – Islamic activist, Brooklyn Park
 Nancy Larson – Democratic National Committee (2004–2012)
 Mark Liebow – Physician, Mayo Clinic
 Roxanne Mindeman – Attorney, Apple Valley
 Cheryl Poling – Chair, Third District DFL Party
 Diana Tastad-Damer – Organizer, UFCW union
 Travis Thompson – Psychologist, University of Minnesota

Mississippi

Electors: 6, pledged to vote for Donald Trump for President and Mike Pence for Vice President:

 Franc Lee – CEO, Tower Loans
 Frank Bordeaux – Chair, State Party (Gulfport)
 Bruce Martin – Mississippi Universities Board
 Johnny McRight – Biostimulants Manufacturer
 Terry Reeves – Father of Governor Tate Reeves
 John Dane, III – Olympic Sailor/CEO Yacht Company

Missouri

Electors: 10, pledged to vote for Donald Trump for President and Mike Pence for Vice President 

 Maureen O’Gorman (District 1, Saint Louis) 
 Penny Henke (District 2, Saint Charles)  – Republican National Committee Member
 Sherry Kuttenkuler (District 3, Holts Summit) – Legislative Assistant
 William “Bill” Kartsonis (District 4, Lake Winnebago) – Manager of Linen Supply Company
 Daniel Wesley Hall, PhD (District 5, Lee’s Summit) – Public Service Commission
 State Senator Dan Hegeman (District 6, Crosby) 
 Ron Richard (District 7, Joplin)  – former MO Senate President Pro Tem
 Mike Homeyer (District 8, Salem) – VP of Finance, Wells Fargo
 State Representative Glen Kolkmeyer (At Large, Odessa) 
 Susie Eckelcamp (At Large, Saint Albans) – Republican National Committee Member

Montana

Electors: 3, pledged to vote for Donald Trump for President and Mike Pence for Vice President:

 Thelma Baker – Owner, Thunderbird Motel (Missoula); Veteran Elector 
 Becky Stockton – 2016 Elector
 Brad Tschida – House Majority Leader

Nebraska

Electors: 5

4 pledged to vote for Donald Trump for President and Mike Pence for Vice President

 George Olmer (District 1) – Republican Activist (Lincoln)
 Teresa Ibach (District 3) – Wife of Trump Deputy Secretary of Agriculture (Sumner)
 Darlene Starman (At-large) – Realtor (Lincoln)
 Steve Nelson (At-large) – Nebraska Farm Bureau

1 pledged to vote for Joe Biden for President and Kamala Harris for Vice President
 Precious McKesson (District 2) – Staffer, Nebraska Democratic Party

Nevada

Electors: 6, pledged to vote for Joe Biden for President and Kamala Harris for Vice President:

 Judith Whitmer – Vice Chair, Clark County Democratic Party
 Sarah Mahler – Chair, Washoe County Democratic Party
 Joseph Throneberry – Cyber and fraud investigations industry leader, Las Vegas
 Artemesia Blanco – Democratic National Committee member
 Gabrielle D'Ayr – homeless veteran, Las Vegas; Clark County Democrats
 Yvanna Cancela, member of the Nevada Senate

New Hampshire

Electors: 4, pledged to vote for Joe Biden for President and Kamala Harris for Vice President:

 Mary Carey Foley – Retired teacher, Portsmouth
 Dana S. Hilliard – Mayor of Somersworth, New Hampshire
 Former House Speaker Steve Shurtleff
 Senate Democratic Leader Donna Soucy

New Jersey

Electors: 14, pledged to vote for Joe Biden for President and Kamala Harris for Vice President:

 Edward Kologi – Attorney, Linden
 Mike Beson – Chair, Monmouth County Democratic Party
 Richard Berdnik – Sheriff, Passaic County
 Kelly Ganges – Chief of Staff, Mercer County
 Brendan Gill – Campaign Manager, Governor Phil Murphy
 LeRoy Jones – Chair, Essex County Democratic Party
 Matt Platkin – Counsel, Governor Phil Murphy
 Tammy Murphy – First Lady of New Jersey
 Saily Avelenda – Executive Director, State Party
 Francesca Giarratana – Hudson County Planning Department
 Lynn Hurwitz – Chair, Hackensack Democratic Party
 Roberta Karpinecz – former councilwoman, Somerville
 Jill Kotner – Staffer, Rep. Mikie Sherrill
 Derya Taskin – Turkish-American filmmaker, Paterson

New Mexico

Electors: 5, pledged to vote for Joe Biden for President and Kamala Harris for Vice President

 Vince Alvarado – President, New Mexico AFL-CIO
 Stephanie Thomas – Chair, Chaves County Democratic Party
 Ben Salazar – Staffer, Senator Tom Udall
 Brianna Gallegos – President NM Young Democrats. 27
 Aleta "Tweety" Suazo – Chair, Native American Democratic Caucus (Acoma)

New York

Electors: 29, pledged to vote for Joe Biden for President and Kamala Harris for Vice President:
June O'Neill (At-Large) – Chair, NYS Democratic Party; economics professor
Xiao Wang (At-Large) – AL&E Corporation, Westbury
  Katherine M. Sheehan (At-Large) – Albany Mayor
Thomas J. Garry (At-Large) – Attorney, Rockville Center
 Lovely Warren (At-Large) – Rochester Mayor 
Gary S. LaBarbera (At-Large) – Construction Trades Union, Wantaugh
Stuart H. Applebaum (At-Large) – President, RWDSU, New York
Mary Sullivan (At-Large) – Civil Service Employees Union, Albany
George K. Gresham (At-Large) – SEIU Vice President, Bronx
Rhonda "Randi" Weingarten (At-Large)
Mario F. Cilento (At-Large) – President, New York State AFL-CIO
Alphonso David (At-Large) – LGBTQ Rights attorney, Brooklyn
Hazel Dukes (At-Large)
Christine C. Quinn (At-Large)
Byron Brown (At-Large) – Buffalo Mayor
Corey Johnson (At-Large)
Scott Stringer (At-Large)
Andrea Stewart-Cousins (At-Large)
Carl Heastie (At-Large)
Jay Jacobs (At-Large) – Chair, NYS Democratic Party, Syosset
Letitia James (At-Large)
Thomas DiNapoli (At-Large)
Kathy Hochul (At-Large) – Lieutenant Governor of New York
Andrew Cuomo (At-Large) – Governor of New York
Hillary Rodham Clinton (At-Large) – Former first lady, senator, secretary of state and 2016 Democratic presidential nominee
Bill Clinton (At-Large) – 42nd President of the United States
Rubén Díaz Jr. (At-Large)
Judith Hunter (At-Large) – Chair, Livingston County Democrats, Geneseo
Anastasia Somoza (At-Large) – Disability Rights Advocate, NYC

North Carolina

Electors: 15, pledged to vote for Donald Trump for President and Mike Pence for Vice President:

 Thomas Hill – Republican Activist/Freemason (Gates)
 Edwin Gavin – Wake County Republican Party
 David Wickersham – Pamlico County Republican Party (Jacksonville)
 Angie Cutlip – Education Consultant (Wendell)
 Jonathan Fletcher – Chair, Gaston County Republican Party 
 Tina Forsberg – Treasurer, Guilford County Republican Party
 Chauncey Lambeth – District Director, US Rep. David Rouzer
 Susan Mills – High School Teacher (Fayetteville)
 Daniel Barry – Former congressional candidate (Charlotte)
 Danny Overcash – Minister and Healer (Charlotte)
 Mark Delk – Asheville NC; 2016 Elector
 Melissa Bell Taylor – Real Estate (Cornelius)
 Blake Williams – Retired General (Alamance County)
 Michelle Nix – Vice Chair, State Party (Hickory)
 Michael Whatley – Chairman, State Party

North Dakota

Electors: 3, pledged to vote for Donald Trump for President and Mike Pence for Vice President:

 Sandy J. Boehler – Republican National Committee Member 
 State Senator Ray Holmberg (Grand Forks) 
 Robert Wefald – Retired District Court Judge

Ohio

Electors: 18, pledged to vote for Donald Trump for President and Mike Pence for Vice President:

 Ken Blackwell (District 1) – Former Ohio Secretary of State (Cincinnati)
 Bonnie Ward (District 2) – Teacher (Waverly City)
 Barbara Clark (District 3) – Rehab Counselor (Columbus); Former Democrat
 Keith Cheney (District 4) – Chair, Allen County Republicans (Lima)
 Mark Wagoner (District 5) – Former State Legislator (Ottawa Hills)
 Dave Johnson (District 6) – Chair, Columbiana County Republican Party (Salem)
 Joy Padgett (District 7) – Former State Senator (Coshocton)
 Patti Alderson (District 8) – State Central Committee Member (West Chester)
 Steve Loomis (District 9) – President of Cleveland Police Union
 Rob Scott (District 10) – City Council Member (Kettering)
 Patricia Weber (District 11) – Summit County School Board (Akron)
 Bob Paduchik (District 12) – State Director, Trump Campaign 2020 (Westerville)
 Karen Arshinkoff (District 13) – Wife of Summit County Chair (Hudson)
 Jim Wert (District 14) – Financial Advisor (Lyndhurst); Major Republican Donor
 Jim Canepa (District 15) – Chief of State, Ohio EPA (Dublin)
 Jane Timken (District 16) – Chair, State Party (Canton)
 Madison Gesiotto (At-large) – Beauty Queen/Conservative Pundit (Canton)
 Darrell Scott (At-large) – Minister (Solon); early Trump backer 2016

Oklahoma

Electors: 7, pledged to vote for Donald Trump for President and Mike Pence for Vice President:

 Ronda Vuillemont-Smith (At-Large) – Tea Party Activist (Tulsa)
 Lonnie Lu Anderson (At-Large) – State Executive Committee (Crowder) 
 Chris Martin (At-Large) – State Executive Committee (Yukon)
 Steve Fair (At-Large) – Republican National Committee (Duncan)
 Linda Huggard (At-Large) – Republican National Committee (OK City)
 A.J. Ferate (At-Large) – Federalist Society Attorney (Edmond)
 Carolyn McLarty (At-Large) – Veterinarian (Stillwater)

Oregon

Electors: 7, pledged to vote for Joe Biden for President and Kamala Harris for Vice President

 Laura Gillpatrick – Chair, Fourth CD Democratic Party
 Carla Lynn Hanson – Chair, State Party (Portland)
 Leigha Lafleur – Paralegal and Democratic Activist (Portland)
 Pete Lee – Vice Chair, State Party
 Sean Nikas – Realtor and Progressive Activist (Salem)
 Nathan Joseph Soltz – Chair, Second CD Democratic Party
 Lawrence D Tayor – Former Democratic National Committee member

Pennsylvania

Electors: 20, pledged to vote for Joe Biden for President and Kamala Harris for Vice President:

 Nina Ahmad
 Val Arkoosh – Supervisor, Montgomery County
 Cindy Bass
 Richard Bloomingdale
 Ryan Boyer – Business Manager, LIUNA
 Paige Gebhardt Cognetti – Mayor, Scranton PA
 Daisy Cruz – Mid-Atlantic Director, SEIU
 Kathy Dahlkemper
 Janet Diaz – City Council, Lancaster
 Virginia McGregor – Deputy Finance Chair, DNC
 Charles Hadley – former candidate for State Representative, Philadelphia
 Jordan A. Harris
 Malcolm Kenyatta
 Gerald Lawrence – Delaware County Board of Elections
 Clifford Levine – Attorney, Pittsburgh
 Nancy Mills – Democratic National Committee member
 Marian Moskowitz – Commissioner, Chester County
 Josh Shapiro
 Sharif Street
 Constance H. Williams

Rhode Island

Electors: 4, pledged to vote for Joe Biden for President and Kamala Harris for Vice President

 Elizabeth Beretta Perik, Treasurer of the State Democratic Party
 James Diossa, mayor of Central Falls, Rhode Island
 Joseph R. Paolino Jr. Former Mayor of Providence and Ambassador to Malta
 Sabina Matos, President of the Providence City Council

South Carolina

Electors: 9, pledged to vote for Donald Trump for President and Mike Pence for Vice President:

 Terry Hardesty (District 1) – Education Consultant (Moncks Corner)
 Jim Ulmer (District 2) – Chair, Orangeburg County Republican Party
 JoAnn Burroughs (District 3) – Chair, Greenwood County Republican Party
 Suzette Jordan (District 4) – Staffer, US Rep. Trey Gowdy
 State Representative Brandon Newton (District 5) – Lancaster 
 Sandra Bryan (District 6) – Chair, Sixth District Republican Party
 Gerri McDaniel (District 7) – Trump Campaign Staffer (North Myrtle Beach)
 Drew McKissick (At-Large) – Chair, State Party
 Cindy Costa (At-Large) – Republican National Committee Member

South Dakota

Electors: 3, pledged to vote for Donald Trump for President and Mike Pence for Vice President:

 Republican Party Chair Dan Lederman (Replaced Governor Kristi Noem) 
 Lieutenant Governor Larry Rhoden
 Attorney General Jason Ravnsborg

Tennessee

Electors: 11, pledged to vote for Donald Trump for President and Mike Pence for Vice President

 Paul Chapman – State Executive Committee
 Cindy Hatcher – State Executive Committee (Blount County)
 Tina Benkiser – Attorney/Former State Party Chair
 John Stanbery – Dentist (Cleveland)
 Beverly Knight-Hurley – Retired (Nashville)
 Mary Ann Parks – State Executive Committee (White House)
 Jim Looney – State Executive Committee (Lawrence County), 7 X Lawrence County Republican Chairman
 Kathy Bryson (District 8) – Christian Mom/State Executive Committee 
 Terry Roland (District 9)- former mayoral candidate (Shelby County) 
 Scott Smith – State Executive Committee (Knoxville)
 Julia Atchley-Pace – Educator (Madisonville)

Texas

Electors: 38, pledged to vote for Donald Trump for President and Mike Pence for Vice President

Nominated at Republican State Convention from Congressional Districts (CD) as follows:
 CD 1 - Marcia Daughtrey – Vice President, Smith County Republican Party
 CD 2 - Steven K. Howell – Political Consultant (Dallas) 
 CD 3 - Jim Pikl – Attorney/Candidate for Judge (Frisco)
 CD 4 - Donnie W. Wisenbaker – Chair, Hopkins County
 CD 5 - Jimmy Weaver – Campaign Strategist (Kaufman County)
 CD 6 - Michael Sabat – Registered Nurse, Texas Asian Republican Assembly (Tarrant County)
 CD 7 - Nancy Scott – Treasurer, Village Republican Women
 CD 8 - Bill O'Sullivan – Texas Patriots PAC (Montgomery County)
 CD 9 - Dawn Elliott – Harris County Republican Party
 CD 10 - Mark Ramsey – Texas Right to Life (Spring TX)
 CD 11 - Matthew Stringer – Conservative Journalist (Odessa)
 CD 12 - Rena Land Peden – Secretary, Texas State Party (Fort Worth)
 CD 13 - Tom Roller – Chair, Potter County (Amarillo)
 CD 14 - Kathleen Allor Nenninger – Bay Area Republican Women (Clear Creek)
 CD 15 - Sean O'Brien – Karnes County Commissioner (Karnes)
 CD 16 - Thomas Edward Reynolds – Attorney (Dallas)
 CD 17 - James Gaines – Economist, Texas A&M University (Bryan)
 CD 18 - Tamon Hamlett – Student, University of Houston, 19
 CD 19 - David Bruegel – Realtor (Lubbock)
 CD 20 - Ken Mercer – Texas State Board of Education (San Antonio)
 CD 21 - Richard "Tex" Hall – Rancher (Bulverde, Conal County) 
 CD 22 - Mike Gibson – Oil Drilling Consultant (Fort Bend County)
 CD 23 - Marco A. Rodriguez – Combat Veteran (San Antonio)
 CD 24 - Dave Gebhart – Bedford City Council 
 CD 25 - Mary Jane Britton Avery - Cellist, 66 
 CD 26 - Peyton Inge
 CD 27 - Gene Seaman – Former State Representative (Corpus Christi)
 CD 28 - Ruby Manen – Chair, Wilson County Republican Party (Floresville)
 CD 29 - Randy Lynn Orr, Jr. – Former State Senate candidate
 CD 30 - Harry Ed Zenner – Cedar Hill
 CD 31 - Paul Matthews – Accountant (Austin) 
 CD 32 - Matt Patrick – Political Activist (Dallas)
 CD 33 - Carol Daley – Parent (Arlington)
 CD 34 - Charles (Tad) Hasse – Computer Technician (Brownsville)
 CD 35 - Naomi Narvaiz – State Executive Committee (San Marcos) 
 CD 36 - Debra Risinger – Harris County Republic Party (Houston)
 At Large - Karen Newton – Texas Federation of Republican Women (San Antonio)
 At Large - State Representative Briscoe Cain – Attorney (Deer Park)

Utah

Electors: 6, pledged to vote for Donald Trump for President and Mike Pence for Vice President:

 Mia Love (replacement for Sean Reyes) – former US Representative
 Former State Representative Greg Hughes – Ran for governor 2020
 Kris Udy – former County Commissioner candidate
 Jimi Kestin – Chair, Washington County Republican Party
 Chris Herrod – former State Representative
 Trent Christensen – Venture capitalist, Congressional candidate 2020

Vermont

Electors: 3, pledged to vote for Joe Biden for President and Kamala Harris for Vice President

 Terje Anderson, former Chair of State Democratic Party
 Linda V. Gravell, Chair of Waterbury County Democratic Party
 Kesha Ram, State Representative

Virginia

Electors: 13, pledged to vote for Joe Biden for President and Kamala Harris for Vice President:

 Matthew D. Rowe – Chair, 1st CD Democratic Committee, GIS administrator, former congressional candidate (Fredericksburg)
 Barbara H. Klear – Treasurer, Democratic Party of Virginia (Norfolk)
 Clinton L. Jenkins – Delegate, 76th District of the Virginia House of Delegates (Portsmouth)
 Kimberly M. Dieber – Nursing coordinator (Richmond)
 Cyliene R. Montgomery – Disability rights activist (Brunswick County)
 Leah V. Pence – Former member of the Luray Town Council
 Robert A. Martin – Postal inspector and activist (Spotsylvania County)
 Charles C. Hines – Retired Journalist  
 Karen B. Combs – Chair, Washington County Democratic Committee
 Ellen "EJ" Scott – Chair, Democratic Black Caucus of Virginia (Manassas) 
 Suchada V. Langley – Economist, US Department of Agriculture (Vienna)
 Margo E. Horner – Chair, 8th CD Democratic Committee (Arlington)
 Susan R. Swecker – Chair, Democratic Party of Virginia (Highland County)

Washington

Electors: 12, pledged to vote for Joe Biden for President and Kamala Harris for Vice President:

 Martin Chaney (District 1) – Fifth District Democrats, Carnation
 Jack Arends (District 2) – School Principal/Administrator, Tumwater 
 Jackie Lane (District 3) – Activist, Battleground
 Patsy Whitefoot (District 4) – Yakima Nation, White Swan
 Nancy Monacelli (District 5) – DNC Member, Walla Walla
 Julie Johnson (District 6) – Lummi Nation, Neah Bay
 Sophia Danenberg (District 7)
 Jen Carter (District 8) – Attorney, Seattle
 Bryan Kesterson (District 9) – Executive Committee, WA State Party
 Julian Wheeler (District 10) – Chair of Pierce County Democrats, Lakewood
 Santiago Ramos (At-large) – Immigrant rights activist, former House candidate, Kirkland
 Payton Swinford (At-large) – Washington State Young Democrats, Ellensburg

West Virginia

Electors: 5, pledged to vote for Donald Trump for President and Mike Pence for Vice President:

 Lewis Rexroad (District 1) – West Virginia Voters Hall of Fame Member (Wood County)
 Beth Bloch (District 2) – Republican National Committee (Kanawha)
 Governor Jim Justice (District 3)
 Paul Hartling (At-Large) – Chair, Republican County Chairs Association (Putnam County)
 Gary Duncan (At-Large) – Republican Activist (Jefferson County)

Wisconsin

Electors: 10, pledged to vote for Joe Biden for President and Kamala Harris for Vice President:

 Mag Andrietsch (District 1), Secretary of Democratic Party WI 
 Shelia Stubbs (District 2)
 Ron Martin (District 3), President, Wisconsin Education Association
 Lieutenant Governor Mandela Barnes (District 4)
 Khary Penebaker (District 5)
 Mary Arnold (District 6), Chair of Columbia County Democratic Party
 State Senator Patty Schachtner (District 7)
 Shannon Holsey (District 8), Chair of Stockbridge-Munsee Band
 Governor Tony Evers (At-Large)
 Ben Wikler (At-Large) – State Party Chair

Wyoming

Electors: 3, pledged to vote for Donald Trump for President and Mike Pence for Vice President:

 Karl Allred (At-Large) – State Executive Committee (Uinta County)
 Doug Chamberlain (At-Large) – Former State Party Treasurer
 Marti Halverson (At-Large) – Former State Representative (2013–2019)

See also 

 Federalist Papers

References 

United States presidential electors, 2020
 
2020
Electors, 2020